The 2012–13 season was Real Sociedad's 67th season in La Liga. The club's league campaign surpassed all expectations as 4th spot was achieved and the team qualified for the Champions league play-off round.

Season summary

The season began with mixed results. A series of home wins and away defeats were reminiscent of previous season's frustration. A convincing win in the Basque derby was the only exception during this disappointing period. Early in November, the club suffered a Copa del Rey defeat away to Segunda División side Córdoba. This was followed by a league defeat at home against 19th-ranked team Espanyol. With the match still in play, fans at the stadium called for Montanier's resignation.

In the Copa del Rey, the team was incapable of overturning the first leg's deficit and exited the competition.

An exceptional run
With an away victory to Málaga, Real Sociedad began a run that stretched from mid-November to the end of the season where the team suffered only two defeats. The team found stability with a 4–2–3–1 formation comprising Asier Illarramendi and Markel Bergara in the double 6 and Xabi Prieto just ahead of them as an attacking midfielder.

Race for fourth
In April, it became clear that either Real Sociedad or Valencia would capture the fourth-place spot. On 28 April, a decisive match between these two took place at Anoeta. Real Sociedad was capable of coming back and won the match, thus opening a five-point gap with Valencia. In the following weeks, however, Valencia won three-straight games while Real Sociedad dropped points. Before the last matchday, Real Sociedad were two points behind Valencia and had to travel to relegation-threatened Deportivo de La Coruña. Real Sociedad won their match and Valencia lost theirs, sending the Basque team to fourth place and securing a spot at the UEFA Champions League play-off round.

Real Sociedad scored 70 goals that season, more than any other club bar Real Madrid and Barcelona and had the fourth-best defence.

Towards the end of the season, when it seemed like Philippe Montanier was about to renew his contract, he signed a contract with Rennes instead. Montanier was awarded the Ramón Cobo trophy, given to the best manager, by the Royal Spanish Football Federation's coaches committee.

League table

Dispute over TV broadcasting rights
Early in 2012, Real Sociedad filed lawsuit against Mediapro on the grounds that payments were not in time or were incomplete. This escalated to a legal case that was eventually won by Real Sociedad. The media group was told to pay what had been established in the contract and €7 million as compensation. Real Sociedad was in addition declared free to sign a broadcasting contract with whoever they wanted to. Weeks before the start of the new season Real Sociedad agreed a 3-year deal with Canal +. Mediapro appealed this decision and in May a provincial court declared that the infringement was not serious enough to justify the €7 million compensation. Real Sociedad had to refund this amount.

Transfers

Players leaving the club (summer)

Loan out

Loan end

Players leaving the club (winter)

Players joining the club (summer)

Signings

Loan in

Loan return

Squad

Start formations
Starting XI
Lineup that started most of the club's competitive matches throughout the season.

Matches

Legend

Pre-season

La Liga

Copa del Rey

Sources

Real Sociedad
Real Sociedad seasons